Sedra may refer to:

A common term for the Weekly Torah portion (sidra or sedra) in Judaism
Adel Sedra, Egyptian electrical engineer who researches microelectronics
Olivier Sedra, public address announcer for the Cleveland Cavaliers
Sedra (film), 2001 Kuwaiti movie
The Sedra Syriac lexical database at sedra.bethmardutho.org